is a convenience store franchise chain in Japan. The store originated in the United States in Cuyahoga Falls, Ohio, but exists today as a Japanese company based in Shinagawa, Tokyo.

The company has its headquarters in East Tower of Gate City Ohsaki in Ōsaki, Shinagawa, Tokyo.

History

Origins in Ohio

In 1939, dairy owner James "J.J." Lawson started a store at his Broad Boulevard dairy plant in Cuyahoga Falls, Ohio, to sell his milk.  The Lawson's Milk Company grew into a chain of stores, primarily in Ohio. Lawson was bought out by Consolidated Foods in 1959.

Lawson's neighborhood convenience stores were common in Ohio from the 1960s through the mid-1980s, selling milk, bread, eggs, orange juice, and specialty items such as deli counter 'chipped' style ham and sour cream potato chip dips. Locations also extended into neighboring states such as Pennsylvania, where Lawson's had a presence in the western portion of the state, including Pittsburgh.

Consolidated was renamed Sara Lee in 1985.  At about the same time, Lawson's stores in the United States were sold to Dairy Mart, a smaller chain of convenience stores located in Enfield, Connecticut.  Dairy Mart moved its headquarters to Cuyahoga Falls, renamed the Lawson's stores, and operated the chain as Dairy Mart for the next 17 years.  Under Dairy Mart, the chain experienced some controversy.  Dairy Mart was sued by the American Family Association, after a Dairy Mart manager in Ohio complained that the company's policy of selling pornography subjected her to sexual and religious harassment. The court case, Stanley v. Lawson Co., was seen as a test of the First Amendment to the United States Constitution. The court ultimately ruled in favor of Lawson.

In 2002, a Canadian-based convenience store company, Alimentation Couche-Tard of Laval, Quebec, bought the assets and name of Dairy Mart.  (The parent company's French name translates to "Night Owl Food" in English.)  Most of the former Dairy Mart stores, which were either originally Lawson's stores, or were located in communities in which Lawson's once had a presence, were converted to the Circle K brand. Due to demand from consumers, it was announced that Lawson's Chip Dip would continue to be sold no matter what the name of the store. A few independently owned Dairy Mart stores in the Columbus, Ohio area survived independent of Circle K and continuing to use the Dairy Mart name and final logo under license from Alimentation Couche-Tard, though in September 2021 these stores went unbranded, officially retiring the Dairy Mart name.

Circle K retains a large presence in Ohio to this day due to the enduring legacy of Lawson's, especially in Northeast Ohio and Columbus, primarily competing with Speedway. However, many of the former Lawson's stores under Dairy Mart in Pennsylvania closed during the late 1990s, and only a few survived by the time Circle K took over the locations. Much of this can be attributed to stronger competition in Pennsylvania from 7-Eleven and Altoona-based Sheetz, as well as UniMart and United Refining Company. Additionally, unlike in Ohio, Dairy Mart failed to invest in fuel sales at its Pennsylvania stores. Circle K retains a small presence in Western Pennsylvania today, but unlike Ohio is a non-factor in the area going up against Sheetz, 7-Eleven/Speedway, GetGo, and locally owned Coen Markets.

Presence in Japan

In 1974, Consolidated signed a formal agreement with The Daiei, Inc., a retail company which also ran a supermarket chain, to open the first Lawson stores in Japan. On April 15, 1975, Daiei Lawson Co., Ltd. was established as a wholly owned subsidiary of Daiei. The first store opened in Sakurazuka, Toyonaka, Osaka Prefecture in June 1975. In September 1979 the official name was changed to Lawson Japan, Inc. The Mitsubishi Corporation became the main shareholder in 2001.

Lawson is one of the top convenience store chains in Japan, third to convenience franchise giants 7-Eleven and FamilyMart.  All of the usual Japanese convenience store goods, such as magazines, video games, manga, soft drinks, onigiri, pastry roulette and bento are available.  Lawson has occasionally collaborated on tie-ins with various companies, including Koei's PlayStation 3 game Dynasty Warriors 7. In celebration of the 25th anniversary of the manga series JoJo's Bizarre Adventure, a Lawson store in author Hirohiko Araki's native Sendai was remodeled to look like the "Owson" store that appears in part 4 of the series. In late 2013, a crossover with All Japan Pro Wrestling saw Triple Crown heavyweight wrestling champion Kohei Suwama appear in ads and even work the till for a photo-op in a Tokyo location.  In early 2016, a Lawson-sponsored Power Cube was introduced into the online game Ingress. DDM and Kadokawa's Kantai Collection also tapped Lawson in limited promotional materials, featuring character representations of shipgirls such as Kashima in Lawson crew outfits, whose popularity persisted long after the promo.

To date, Lawson operates over 11,384 stores.  They are found in all 47 prefectures of Japan, as well as China, Indonesia, Thailand, the Philippines and United States (see below). In 2014, the company announced plans to open stores specifically designed for elderly consumers.

In September 2014, Lawson announced it would acquire Japanese chain Seijo Ishii Co. for around $503 million from Marunouchi Capital.

In October 2016, Lawson announced it was partnering with The Bank of Tokyo-Mitsubishi UFJ.  After receiving the appropriate license from the Japanese Financial Services Agency, the move would allow Lawson stores to offer cash withdrawal, deposit and transfer services, over and above the ATM services that are already provided.

In February 2017, Lawson became a subsidiary of Mitsubishi Corp.

Among the more notable fans of Lawson include professional wrestler Chris Jericho, who would frequently shop at Lawson when he wrestled in Japan in the 1990s. Jericho still visits Lawson whenever he returns to Japan, whether to wrestle or if he is touring with his rock band Fozzy.

In 2005, Lawson opened its first "Lawson 100" store, where items are 100 yen plus 5 yen tax for a total of 105yen.

Return to the United States
With the establishment of "Lawson USA Hawaii, Inc.", Lawson returned to the U.S. market, with two locations in Honolulu opening on July 7, 2012. One of the stores is in the Sheraton Waikiki, while the other is in the Moana Hotel.

Further expansion in both Hawaii and the mainland U.S. is planned.

Environmental commitment
As of May 2012, Lawson had solar equipment at 20 of its stores, but the company announced in June 2012 that it would install solar panels at 2,000 of its 10,000 Japanese stores.  It was estimated that each store would generate about 11,000 kWh per year. Just under 2,000 kWh of this would go toward climate control and other in-house uses, which would account for about 1% of each store's power consumption. The rest of the electricity would be sold under Japan's feed-in tariff system that came into operation on July 1, 2012. It was estimated that the company's income from the power generated by the 2,000 stores would come to more than 700 million yen a year.

Lawson planned to install solar panels at 1,000 stores in the 2012–2013 financial year, and 1,000 more in the 2013–2014 financial year. It chose solar panels from Solar Frontier, along with the same company's online monitoring system, for the first 1,000 stores.

In other countries

China

Lawson has more than 5,200 stores in China, which are found in and around five major cities: Chongqing, Beijing, Shenyang, Shanghai and Wuhan. The Shanghai region is the largest, with more than 2,000 locations.

Indonesia
In August 2011, Lawson opened its first Indonesian store in Jakarta.  In Indonesia, Lawson is a subsidiary of Alfamidi (PT Midi Utama Indonesia Tbk), a sister company of Alfamart.

Thailand
In 2013, Lawson began opening stores in Thailand under the name Lawson 108. The stores are run as a joint venture between Lawson Japan and the Thai consumer goods giant Saha Group.

The Philippines
Lawson Asia Pacific and Puregold Price Club formed a joint venture under the name PG Lawson Company Inc. They opened their first branch in Manila, on March 30, 2015. Under the partnership, Lawson will provide its expertise in convenience store's know-how and product development while Puregold will provide its expertise in product procurement and localized knowledge of retail consumers.  They plan to open 500 stores by 2020. However, in 2018, Puregold sold its 70 percent stake to Lawson after the said company exited the convenience store business. Despite the Puregold exit, the Philippine branches of Lawson are continued to operate until they found a new partnership.

In 2019, Lawson has partnered with Ayala Corporation and struck a deal of partnership, continuing to expand its footprint in the country to 500 stores by 2024. The store chain is also considering a collaboration with Ayala's online retail business, such as contributing convenience stores to be used as product pickup depots as well as the operational tie-up with a logistics group company.

South Korea  
As of 2019, Lawson stores do not exist in South Korea. In 1989, after the 1988 Summer Olympics, some Lawson stores were in South Korea. In 1995 Kolon Group, the parent company of Kolon Industries, bought the rights to Lawson in South Korea. In October 1999, Lotte Corporation purchased the rights to what was left of Lawson from Kolon, and in 2000, the brand was absorbed into the 7-Eleven franchise, which Lotte is licensed to operate in South Korea.

See also 
Loppi (ticketing system)

References

External links

  
 Corporate information  
 Lawson China 
 Lawson Beijing  
 Lawson Dalian  
 Hualian Lawson (in Shanghai) 
 Lawson Chongqing  
 Lawson 108 (in Thailand)
 Lawson Philippines 
 Lawson Indonesia
 Lawson USA Hawaii

1939 establishments in Ohio
Retail companies based in Tokyo
Companies listed on the Tokyo Stock Exchange
Convenience stores of Japan
Japanese brands
Retail companies established in 1939
Convenience stores of the Philippines